Narat-Chukur (Naratsoqor) is a rural locality (a village) in Diyashevsky Selsoviet, Bakalinsky District, Bashkortostan, Russia. The population was 86 as of 2010. There are 2 streets.

Geography 
Narat-Chukur is located 31 km west of Bakaly (the district's administrative centre) by road. Nikolayevka is the nearest rural locality.

References 

Rural localities in Bakalinsky District